Blessed Antonia may refer to:
Antonia of Florence (1401-1472), Franciscan
Antonia of Brescia (1407-1507), Dominican
María Antonia de Paz y Figueroa (1730-1799), Daughters of the Divine Savior
Antonia Maria Verna (1773-1838), Institute of Sisters of Mercy of the Immaculate Conception
María Antonia Bandrés Elósegui (1898-1919), Daughters of Jesus
Antonia Mesina (1919-1935), martyr
Antonia Riba Mestres (1893-1936), also known as Sister Climenta of Saint John the Baptist, one of the martyrs of El Saler in the Spanish Civil War